Crystal Lockhart (born 1997) is an American musician and actor.

Early life 
Lockhart was born on April 3 in Riverside County, California. Their mother is from South Korea, and their father is of Danish heritage. Lockhart grew up in a very Christian household.

Career 
Lockhart has been described as an actor, dancer, and musician, and as a "California alt-pop artist".

Lockhart had a small part in the original cut of the 2013 film The Purge, but did not make it into the theatrical release.

In 2018, Lockhart released a video for a cover version of "I Put a Spell on You". They were featured in the music video for Taylor Swift's "You Need to Calm Down" in 2019.

In July 2020, Lockhart joined Monique Heart, Jay Jurden, and Patrick Rogers in hosting The Rearview podcast by Grindr and the Forever Dog Network, a queer roundtable where each week, all four hosts and a guest come together to discuss pop culture, sex, dating, and politics. On September 16, 2020, Lockhart released an EP titled Wet Metal, taking on a hyperpop sound.

In 2021, Lockhart created a satirical parody talkshow titled Girlboss Today which critiques queerphobic elements of Christianity as well as rainbow capitalism. The series is broadcast live on Lockhart's Twitch channel, Lockhart plays a wine-loving Karen character that is obsessed with being an independent business owner.

On September 3, 2021, Lockhart appeared on Lady Gaga's Dawn of Chromatica album, remixing "Sine from Above" featuring Elton John along with Mood Killer and Lil Texas. The remix peaked at number 39 on the Billboard Hot Dance/Electronic Songs chart.

In November 2021, Lockhart directed Rina Sawayama's Dynasty Tour in the United Kingdom and Ireland, as well as choreographed the music video for "My Agenda" by Dorian Electra.

Personal life 
Lockhart identifies as queer, uses singular they pronouns as well as singular she pronouns, and described themselves as non-binary.

Discography

Extended plays

Singles

Other charted songs

Filmography

Television

References

External links 
 
 

1997 births
Living people
21st-century LGBT people
American LGBT people of Asian descent
American LGBT singers
American non-binary actors
American people of Danish descent
American people of Korean descent
LGBT dancers
LGBT people from California
Non-binary musicians
People from Riverside County, California
Queer musicians
Queer people